Russo-German war may refer to:

 Eastern Front (World War I)
 Eastern Front (World War II)
 Ukraine Conflict (2014-onward)